Vlasta may refer to:
Vlasta (given name)
 Vlasta (mythology), a leader in the Maidens' War in Czech mythology
 The Death of Vlasta, an opera by Otakar Ostrčil
 Vlasta (magazine), Czech magazine for women